The Dr. Ward Beebe House, also known as the John Leuthold Residence, is a three-story stucco prairie house built by Dr. Ward and Bess Beebe and designed by Purcell and Elmslie in 1912. Purcell and Elmslie were prolific designers of prairie style homes. It is located in the West Summit Avenue Historic District, in Saint Paul, Minnesota, United States.

Dr. Ward Beebe was a bacteriologist, and the house was built for him and his wife Bess as a wedding present from her parents.  The Beebe house is the firm's only house in Saint Paul, and includes some elements from English Arts and Crafts design as well as the Prairie Style.  Purcell and Elmslie designed the primary rooms with good views, since the Summit Avenue location was important.  Purcell was quoted as saying, "At the time... it was one of the most talked about residential streets in America, broad and with beautiful trees; the views up and down the street were valued.  So the unusual corner windows looking both ways from the living room were accepted as a fine response toward a choice and expensive location."  The house has a large cross-gabled roof with deep eaves, giving it a broader look than its narrow structure would otherwise indicate.  On the inside, the living room and the dining room are centered around a hearth and have no walls between them, similar to the Dr. Oscar Owre House in Minneapolis.  The firm preferred to avoid building walls in first-floor living areas so they could increase the sense of space.  The second floor has three bedrooms, a bathroom, and a tiny library sitting room with bay windows and a window seat.  Elmslie also designed detailed art glass insets for the bookcases near the entrance.

References

1912 establishments in Minnesota
Houses completed in 1912
Houses in Saint Paul, Minnesota
Houses on the National Register of Historic Places in Minnesota
Individually listed contributing properties to historic districts on the National Register in Minnesota
National Register of Historic Places in Saint Paul, Minnesota
Prairie School architecture in Minnesota
Purcell and Elmslie buildings